Supratim Bhol (born 10 December 1979) is an Indian cinematographer known for his works in Hindi cinema and Bengali cinema. He has also worked in other regional language projects in Haryanvi, Odia and Chhattisgarhi. Supratim graduated from the Film and Television Institute of India (FTII) and debuted as a Cinematographer with the film Colours of Innocence (2016) directed by Manas Mukul Pal, a National Award winner. His remarkable works till now are Panchlait, national award winner Avijatrik, Aparajito, Abyakto, Lomad and national award winner Dada Lakhmi. Suprartim won the 68th National Fllm Awards for Best Cinematography

Early life and education 
Supratim was born on 10 December 1979 in the Midnapore District of West Bengal in a farmer's family. The region is famous for Patchitra – the oldest Audio-Visual art form of India, as a result, art started nurturing in him at an early age. He was educated at the St. Xavier's Collegiate School, Kolkata and grew up in the old and beautiful alleyways of traditional North Kolkata, achieving a Senior Diploma in 1995 and a Visharad in 1996 in Theoretical Art, from Sarba Bharatiya Sangeet O Sanskriti Parishad, Kolkata. He had a passion for photography and later he honed his skills in photographic studies, from his mentor photographer Pranab Basu and from Fergusson College, Pune. After that he joined the Film and Television Institute of India (FTI), Pune, where he studied cinematography.

Career 
After graduating from the Film and Television Institute of India, he started his career travelling across 23 states of India shooting short films, corporate films, music videos, advertisements and documentaries. Supratim debuted shooting his first feature Sahaj Pather Gappo (2016) directed by Manas Mukul Pal, the picturesque imagery of his got him attention as Supratim got nominated for Filmfare Awards East in 2017 and the film travelled the globe eventually winning the National Award. His first Hindi feature was Panchlait (2017) directed by Prem Prakash Modi was released pan India and was selected in the 49th International Film Festival of India. He has collaborated with Arjun Dutta for Abyakto (2018), Guldasta (2020) and Shrimati (2021), which garnered the duo with critical acclaim. His next important work was Avijatrik (2020), directed by Subhrajit Mitra, is a sequel to The Apu Trilogy, produced by Madhur Bhandarkar and Gaurang Jalan. The film has travelled around the world eventually winning him accolades and the 2020 European Cinematography Awards. He received the Best Cinematography Award at the 68th National Film Award in New Delhi for fulfilling the aspirations from script to the images through classical elegance. He also won the Filmfare Award Bangla and the West Bengal Film Journalists’ Association Award for Best Cinematography. The film was in nomination for Knight Marimbas Award at the Miami International Film Festival, got screened at the Shanghai International Film Festival and also at the Indian Panorama section in 51st International Film Festival of India. The film also won the Special Jury Prize at the 13th Bengaluru International Film Festival. Lomad (The Fox) world's first Black and White One-shot (93 minutes) feature film from India has been shot by him. He has also worked as an Additional Cinematographer on several films like Khashi Katha (2013), Kolkatar King, Nachom-ia Kumpasar (2015), Color Black and Basu Paribar (2019).

Filmography

References

External links 
 Official website
 Official Facebook
 

Hindi film cinematographers
Artists from Kolkata
Film and Television Institute of India alumni
20th-century Indian photographers
21st-century Indian photographers
Cinematographers from West Bengal
Indian cinematographers
Living people
1979 births